Tom Roger Aadland (born 26 April 1964) is a Norwegian lyricist and musician.

Personal life
Born in Haugesund on 26 April 1964, Aadland grew up in Vikebygd in Vindafjord. He resides in Oslo.

Career
His 2009-album  contained songs such as "Vikla inn i blått" and "Du gjer meg einsam når du dreg", which were translations of lyrics by Bob Dylan into Nynorsk language. The album  from 2016 was again a Nynorsk version of Dylan's songs, and earned him a radio award. In 2021 he issued the album .

He was co-author of the book Bob Dylan. Mannen, myten og musikken from 2011, and has written lyrics for the rock band Hellbillies and the folk music band Vamp. His Dylan translations were basis for the theatre concert Vikla inn i blått – Dylan på nynorsk staged at Det Norske Teatret in 2020, directed by Eirik Stubø.

References

1964 births
Living people
People from Haugesund
Norwegian singers
Norwegian guitarists
Norwegian songwriters
Norwegian translators
Norwegian Academy of Music alumni